Appaloosa is a 2008 American Western film based on the 2005 novel Appaloosa by crime writer Robert B. Parker. Directed by Ed Harris and co-written by Harris and Robert Knott, Appaloosa stars Harris alongside Viggo Mortensen, Renée Zellweger and Jeremy Irons. The film premiered at 2008 Toronto International Film Festival and was released in selected cities on September 19, 2008, then expanded into wide-release on October 3, 2008.

Plot
In 1882, the small town of Appaloosa, New Mexico, is being terrorized by local rancher Randall Bragg, who killed the town's marshal, Jack Bell, and two deputies when they came to Bragg's ranch to arrest two men. The town hires lawman and peacekeeper Virgil Cole and his deputy Everett Hitch to protect and regain control of the town. The pair agrees on one condition: that the town follow Cole's law and essentially cede control to him. The lawmen begin by confronting four of Bragg's men who are causing a disturbance in the saloon. Three men refuse to allow themselves to be arrested, forcing Cole and Hitch to kill them. The fourth man surrenders and leaves the saloon. Bragg has a meeting with Cole and Hitch, initiating a standoff.

Hitch sees a woman, Allison "Allie" French, a young widow, who just came to the town and immediately takes an interest in her. He follows her to the diner where Cole is having a breakfast. They make acquaintance with her and observing Cole and Allie are getting together well, Hitch keeps his silence. Soon, Cole and Allie begin a romantic relationship and buy a house together. However, Allie attempts to seduce Hitch when they are alone but Hitch refuses her advances out of his loyalty to Cole.

When one of Bragg's men tells Cole and Hitch that he will testify against Bragg on the triple murder case, they arrest Bragg and keep him locked up until the trial in spite of the attempts of Bragg's gang to free him. The trial finds him guilty and sentences him to death. Cole and Hitch are joined by Sheriff Clyde Stringer and a deputy before transporting Bragg via train to the prison where he is to be hanged. When the engine makes a water stop over a bridge, hired guns Ring and Mackie Shelton, old acquaintances of Cole, appear with Allie as a hostage. At gunpoint, they force Cole to release Bragg to them.

Cole and Hitch catch up with the outlaws and see Allie and Ring Shelton frolicking naked together in a stream. When the outlaws are attacked by Chiricahua Apache, Cole and Hitch force the Native Americans away. Hitch tells Cole that Allie's promiscuity is the result of her insecurity and she really likes Cole. They then turn Bragg over to the sheriff of Beauville; unbeknownst to Cole, the sheriff is a cousin of the Shelton brothers. Knowing that Cole is determined to bring Bragg to the gallows, the Sheltons and the sheriff free Bragg and engage Cole and Hitch in a gunfight. Cole and Hitch are wounded but manage to kill Ring, Mackie and the sheriff. Bragg escapes on horseback and Cole and Hitch return to Appaloosa with Allie.

After some time, Bragg is granted a full pardon by President Chester Arthur (whom he previously claimed to have known) and returns to Appaloosa in an attempt to publicly reform himself. He buys the hotel and ingratiates himself with the locals. Privately he brags before Cole and Hitch to infuriate them over their failure to hang him. Cole tells Hitch that he still wants to be with Allie, despite her fickleness. Hitch decides to leave the town to make some money and resigns as deputy. Later he discovers that Allie is having a relationship with Bragg and challenges Bragg to a duel. Cole attempts to stop him, but Hitch remains steadfast and asks Cole to permit the gunfight to occur. Hitch manages to fire first, hitting Bragg in the chest, killing him. Hitch leaves town, seeing that Allie and Cole are together; his parting thoughts express his hope that Cole can find happiness with Allie and for him, he gladly walks into uncertainty in hope of finding adventure and fortune.

Cast
 Ed Harris as Virgil Cole
 Viggo Mortensen as Everett Hitch
 Renée Zellweger as Allie French
 Jeremy Irons as Randall Bragg
 Lance Henriksen as Ring Shelton
 Adam Nelson as Mackie Shelton
 Timothy Spall as Phil Olson
 Ariadna Gil as Katie
 James Gammon as Earl May
 Tom Bower as Abner Raines
 Rex Linn as Sheriff Clyde Stringer
 Corby Griesenbeck as Deputy Charlie Tewksbury
 Timothy V. Murphy as Vince Sullivan
 Agathe Golaszewska as Kid
 Makenzie Vega as Stunt
Bob Harris, Ed Harris's father, has a small role as Judge Elias Callison.

Production
Appaloosa marks Ed Harris's second outing as director, following the 2000 biopic Pollock, which he also starred in; Harris co-wrote and co-produced Appaloosa with Robert Knott. The budget for Appaloosa was $20 million and filming took place from October 1, 2007, to November 24, 2007, around Albuquerque and Santa Fe, New Mexico, and Austin, Texas. Harris was drawn to Robert B. Parker's bestselling novel because it was constructed like a classic Western, but included crime themes still relevant to contemporary society. He purchased the rights to the novel and hired Parker to adapt his book into a screenplay. Harris, who also stars as Virgil Cole, wanted to make the film in the old-fashioned style of such films as 3:10 to Yuma, My Darling Clementine and The Man Who Shot Liberty Valance, rather than a revisionist approach. Harris also acknowledged the challenge of making a successful Western movie, saying, "You can count on one hand, or maybe half a hand, the number of Westerns that were box office successes in the recent past." Production of Appaloosa slowed when New Line Cinema and producers became concerned with the box office prospects of a Western during a season with such anticipated blockbusters as The Dark Knight. Diane Lane originally signed on to play Allie French, but left the project when the film stalled. The movie got back on track due to the success of the Deadwood series on HBO and the film remake of 3:10 to Yuma. Renée Zellweger was signed to replace Lane.

Harris enjoyed working with Viggo Mortensen in A History of Violence and had him in mind for the part of Everett Hitch. While publicizing A History of Violence at the Toronto International Film Festival, Harris handed Mortensen a copy of the novel and asked him to read it and consider playing the part. Harris said it was "a totally awkward proposition, handing another actor a book like that," but Mortensen agreed to take the part after responding well to the character and the relationship dynamic between the two characters. Harris said he wanted to make the film because he was drawn to the "unspoken comradeship" of Virgil Cole and Everett Hitch. "Though they've been hanging out for years, they're not too intimate, but they know each other. Aside from in sports, or being a cop, I can't think of any other situation where a friendship like that is called for." Mortensen felt similarly, saying, "I like to ride horses, and I like Westerns, but there are a lot of bad ones. What set this one apart is just how the characters are a little more guarded." Mortensen studied Frederic Remington drawings and other images of the American Old West to get into character and master the proper way to stand during a gunfight.

The DVD includes a number of bonus extra featurettes, including "Dean Semler's Return to the Western." Although cinematographer Semler has been a pioneer in shooting digital movies, he was glad for this special opportunity to shoot a traditional old-fashioned Western using classic film stock technology.

Soundtrack

The soundtrack to Appaloosa was released on  September 30, 2008.

Reception
On Rotten Tomatoes, Appaloosa has an approval rating of 76% based on 164 reviews, with an average rating of 6.7/10. The consensus reads, "A traditional genre western, Appaloosa sets itself apart with smart psychology, an intriguing love triangle, and good chemistry between the leads." 

Early reviews of Appaloosa from the 2008 Toronto International Film Festival were lukewarm. Brad Frenette of the National Post said "the film feels double its 114-minute running time, but Appaloosa redeems itself through unexpected moments of levity, Harris's steady direction and the God amongst men, Lance Henriksen." Frenette also said Renee Zellweger is "mostly a bust" and Viggo Mortensen "oozes cool." Popjournalism reviewer Sarah Gopaul said Harris and Mortensen spend too much time talking and discussing their feelings, which she said made the film too light for the gritty Western genre. Gopaul said Ed Harris and Viggo Mortensen delivered decent performances and that Renee Zellweger's character has more depth than the traditional romantic interest in a Western.  The New Yorker’s David Denby called it “a well-made, satisfying, traditionalist Western with some odd quirks and turns.”

The film appeared on some critics' top ten lists of the best films of 2008. Ray Bennett of The Hollywood Reporter named it the 8th best film of 2008, and Mike Russell of The Oregonian named it the 10th best film of 2008.

References

External links
 
 
 
 
 
 

2008 films
2008 Western (genre) films
American Western (genre) films
2000s English-language films
Films based on American novels
Films shot in New Mexico
Films shot in Texas
Films directed by Ed Harris
Films scored by Jeff Beal
Films set in New Mexico
Films set in 1882
2000s American films